Li Chenglong (born 6 January 1997) is a Chinese footballer currently playing as a defender for China League One side Heilongjiang Ice City.

Club career
Li Chenglong would make his professional debut on 30 April 2019 in a Chinese FA Cup game against Liaoning F.C. in a 1–0 victory. This would be followed by his first league appearance on 18 May 2019 against Guangzhou R&F in a game that ended in a 3–1 defeat.

Career statistics

References

External links

1997 births
Living people
Chinese footballers
Chinese expatriate footballers
Association football defenders
Chinese Super League players
China League One players
Beijing Renhe F.C. players
K.S.V. Roeselare players
Expatriate footballers in Belgium
Chinese expatriate sportspeople in Belgium